Apolosi Vonowale Satala (born 14 August 1978 in Namoli, Lautoka Fiji) is a Fijian rugby union footballer.  He plays as a wing, centre, number eight and Flanker . His nickname is Apo. He is the cousin of Namoli steelman, Viliame Satala. He is married to Olivia and they have two children and is a private in the Army serving with 1st Battalion The Royal Regiment of Scotland. He grew up in the city of  Lautoka and he played for Lautoka in the National Provincial Rugby Tournament in Fiji.  He has represented Fiji in the Rugby Sevens as well as in fifteens.  He plays as a prop/hooker in the sevens code.  He  is a member of the British Armed Forces and he also played sevens rugby for the army team winning many tournaments.

He represented Fiji in the 2006 Commonwealth Games where Fiji won the bronze medal defeating Australia. He was picked by the Leeds Carnegie rugby club  which plays in the National Division One. He played 8 games for them scoring his first try against Saracens in the EDF Energy Cup and scored a further 2 against defending champions, Bath. A member of the winning Army Middlesex Sevens team in both 2001 and 2004, he  played for Fiji in the  2005 Rugby World Cup Sevens and returned from Hong Kong with a winners medal and the Melrose Cup. he made his debut for Fiji in the XV's man code in June 2005 against Tonga. he has also played for the Heriot's Rugby Club and the Edinburgh Gunners briefly and Taunton RFC. He now plays for the Gloucester rugby  as a replacement for injured flanker and fellow Fijian, Akapusi Qera. He signed a contract with Gloucester until the end of the 2009/2010 season. He has signed to join Sale Sharks for the 2010/2011 season on a 1-year contract.

References

External links
 
 
 

1978 births
Living people
Sportspeople from Lautoka
People educated at Lelean Memorial School
Fijian rugby union players
Rugby union wings
Rugby union centres
Rugby union flankers
Fiji international rugby union players
Commonwealth Games bronze medallists for Fiji
Rugby sevens players at the 2006 Commonwealth Games
Fijian expatriate rugby union players
Expatriate rugby union players in England
Fijian expatriate sportspeople in England
Sale Sharks players
Gloucester Rugby players
Leeds Tykes players
Fiji international rugby sevens players
Fijian soldiers
I-Taukei Fijian people
Commonwealth Games medallists in rugby sevens
Commonwealth Games rugby sevens players of Fiji
Medallists at the 2006 Commonwealth Games